Stephen Lee Bruner (born October 19, 1984), better known by his stage name Thundercat, is an American bassist, singer, producer, and songwriter from Los Angeles. First coming to prominence as a member of crossover thrash band Suicidal Tendencies, he has since released four solo studio albums and is noted for his work with producer Flying Lotus and his appearances on Kendrick Lamar's 2015 album To Pimp a Butterfly. In 2016, Thundercat won a Grammy for Best Rap/Sung Performance for his work on the track "These Walls" from To Pimp a Butterfly. In 2020, Thundercat released his fourth studio album, It Is What It Is, which earned him a Grammy Award for Best Progressive R&B Album.

Early life
Raised in Compton and other parts of Los Angeles, Bruner was born into a family of musicians, including his father Ronald Bruner Sr., a drummer, and his mother Pam, a flutist and percussionist. His father played drums for The Temptations, The Supremes, and Gladys Knight, amongst others. After Bruner Sr. got sober from cocaine, the children would watch him play gigs at the Crenshaw Christian Center. Bruner attended Locke High School, playing in the school's jazz band. His teacher, Reggie Andrews, produced and co-wrote the Dazz Band's 1982 single "Let It Whip" and collaborated with Rick James. Andrews re-introduced Bruner to Kamasi Washington, who originally met as children through their fathers' membership in a gospel fusion band. The reunited duo would sneak into jazz concerts, driving around in a worn-down 1982 Ford Mustang to do so. They would later get to play the same venues as the performers they watched. They also did sessions with Bruner's cousin Terrace Martin in Washington's father's garage during this time.

Career
Bruner began playing the bass at an early age, listening to bass players such as Stanley Clarke and Marcus Miller for inspiration. By the age of 15, he had a minor hit in Germany as a member of the boy band No Curfew. A year later, he joined his brother Ronald Jr. as a member of the Los Angeles crossover thrash band Suicidal Tendencies, replacing former bass player Josh Paul. Bruner's earliest studio album appearances include playing electric bass on Kamasi Washington's Live at 5th Street Dick's and The Proclamation. 

Erykah Badu was credited with helping Bruner find his stage presence and identity as Thundercat. Around this time, Bruner would play in live bands for Raphael Saadiq and Snoop Dogg, and both would make quips about his playing style. Bruner credited Flying Lotus with pushing him to start singing and making his own projects. 

He released his first solo album in 2011, The Golden Age of Apocalypse, which featured production from Flying Lotus, and was influenced by 1970s fusion artists such as Stanley Clarke and George Duke, who his brother also later toured with. The next two years saw a return to the recording studio with fellow Brainfeeder artist Flying Lotus, with contributions to Flying Lotus' Until the Quiet Comes (2012) and You're Dead! (2014), and the release of Thundercat's second album Apocalypse (2013).

Collaborations 
In 2004, Bruner collaborated with Kamasi Washington, as well as Cameron Graves and Ronald Jr., under the name The Young Jazz Giants. The group later united with Terrace Martin and five other Los Angeles jazz musicians to form the West Coast Get Down collective, with whom they recorded several albums.

Along with his band duties, Bruner is also a session musician, acclaimed for his work on Erykah Badu's New Amerykah (2008) and Flying Lotus' Cosmogramma (2010). 

Bruner was a major contributor to Kendrick Lamar's critically acclaimed album To Pimp a Butterfly in 2015, and has been described as being "at the creative epicenter" of the project. Longtime Thundercat collaborators Flying Lotus, Kamasi Washington, and Terrace Martin were also major contributors to the album.

Bruner was a frequent collaborator on Mac Miller's tracks. On August 6, 2018, Bruner played bass during Miller's Tiny Desk Concert, during which the two played their collaborative track, "What's the Use?" 

In 2022, he collaborated with virtual band Gorillaz on their single "Cracker Island", the first single and title track for their upcoming album of the same name. The song was released on April 30, 2022.

Solo albums

The Beyond / Where the Giants Roam 

On June 22, 2015, Thundercat released The Beyond / Where the Giants Roam EP, which was developed during the production of To Pimp a Butterfly. The EP includes tributes to his friend and collaborator Austin Peralta, a jazz pianist who was signed to Brainfeeder before his death in 2012. The EP also includes a feature from Herbie Hancock and was the first appearance of "Them Changes".

In 2016, Bruner revealed to XXL that he was working on a new album with Flying Lotus as a main contributor. In May of that year, Bruner appeared live with Red Hot Chili Peppers to play additional bass on their song "Go Robot" at iHeartRadio's release party for the band's 2016 album The Getaway. In August 2016, Bruner appeared live with singers Kenny Loggins and Michael McDonald in Chicago.

Drunk 
In June 2017, Thundercat appeared on The Tonight Show Starring Jimmy Fallon to promote his studio album Drunk with Michael McDonald and Kenny Loggins. "Them Changes" contains a drum sample from the 1977 Isley Brothers track "Footsteps in the Dark", the same sample used in Ice Cube's 1993 single "It Was a Good Day" (although the latter more heavily sampled the original).

It Is What It Is 
In October 2018, Thundercat premiered the song "King of the Hill" from his then upcoming album It Is What It Is. The second single, "Black Qualls", featuring Steve Lacy, Steve Arrington, and Childish Gambino, was released on January 16. Another single, "Dragonball Durag", was released on February 17. It Is What It Is released on April 3, 2020, and was met with critical acclaim. Thundercat dedicated the album to friend and frequent collaborator Mac Miller. In 2020, It Is What It Is won Best Progressive R&B Album at the 63rd Annual Grammy Awards.

In 2021, he received the Libera Award for Best R&B Record 2021 for his album It Is What It Is (Brainfeeder Records) by the American Association of Independent Music (A2IM). The album was also nominated as Record of the Year, but lost to Phoebe Bridgers' album Punisher.

In 2022, he made a guest appearance in the fourth episode of The Book of Boba Fett as a "Mod Artist" who Boba Fett enlists to save Fennec Shand's life in a flashback where he replaced her damaged parts with cybernetic replacements.

Personal life
He has a teenage daughter named Sanaa.

Bruner was a close friend of the rapper Mac Miller, and the two often spent time together in their personal lives. Miller's death in 2018 made Bruner confront his own substance abuse and alcoholism, causing him to drink less and adopt better eating habits. "It's sex, drugs and rock'n'roll. It's real. You ride the line, you don't know how close you are sometimes. Do I think he meant to die? No, I don't think he did. Even though that sometimes creeps in there because you're always on the edge of a knife. Sometimes you mess up. That happens a lot," Bruner shared in a 2020 interview with The Guardian. 

Bruner is a big fan of anime and cartoons, and will wear outfits that reflect this, such as a Pikachu backpack, cat-ear headbands, and the Interface Headset from the anime Neon Genesis Evangelion. His stage name, taken from the 1985 cartoon series Thundercats, is further evidence of these influences. Bruner is a Christian, and incorporates many of the religion's themes in his music.

Instruments 
Bruner is most often seen playing his six-string Ibanez Custom Shop model bass (tuned to BEADGC); it has a hollowed-out maple body, five-piece maple/jatoba neck, and rosewood fingerboard. It utilizes EMG magnetic pickups, Graph Tech Ghost piezo saddles, and a MIDI-capable in/out.

Discography

 The Golden Age of Apocalypse (2011)
 Apocalypse (2013)
 Drunk (2017)
 It Is What It Is (2020)

Filmography

Awards and nominations 
Grammy Awards

Libera Awards

References

External links

 
 

1984 births
20th-century African-American male singers
American session musicians
Grammy Award winners for rap music
Jazz musicians from California
Living people
Place of birth missing (living people)
Guitarists from Los Angeles
American male bass guitarists
21st-century American singers
Brainfeeder artists
21st-century American bass guitarists
21st-century American male singers
American male jazz musicians
African-American guitarists
21st-century African-American male singers
Nu jazz musicians